DJ Supreme may refer to:

DJ Supreme The Grandmaster, 1991 World Supremacy DJ Champion, 2010 DMC USA Supremacy Champion, DJ for Lauryn Hill
Space Cowboy (musician) (born 1975), formerly known as "DJ Supreme"
DJ Supreme, member of Hijack (group)